The New Adventures of Pinocchio is a 1999 direct-to-video film that is a sequel to the 1996 film The Adventures of Pinocchio. The film was directed by Michael Anderson and featured Martin Landau reprising his role as Geppetto with Udo Kier reprising his role as Lorenzini, but also playing Lorenzini's widow Madame Flambeau. The film also featured Sarah Alexander, Simon Schatzberger, Warwick Davis, Ben Ridgeway, and introduced Gabriel Thomson as Pinocchio. This is the last film Michael Anderson directed, since Summer of the Monkeys in this film, before his death in 2018.

Plot
In July 1890, Geppetto is finishing up his puppets for the Royal Puppet Festival. His son Pinocchio and his friend Lampwick skip school to go to a carnival. While there, they watch a presentation by the carnival's leader, Madame Flambeau. She gives a man with one shorter leg some of her Elixir, and his leg grows to the length of the other one. The carnival's dwarf then leads Pinocchio and Lampwick to "The Hall of Freaks", a place with a clown named Mister Laffy who washes his depressed face, an albino named Sizzler who can blow fire from his mouth (though ironic as he appears to be freezing), a large aquarium fish with human faces, a bearded lady named Loretta Largesse, and a fairy called "Blue" who only Pinocchio can see. They then return to Pinocchio's house and find Geppetto, who is very sick. Pinocchio and Lampwick then return to the carnival to each buy some of Madame Flambeau's Elixir. Volpe and Felinet, who are now fox and cat humanoids, lead them to Madame Flambeau. They don't have enough money for the Elixir, so they agree to work for her in the carnival. Lampwick drinks his Elixir and returns home, and Pinocchio gives his Elixir to Geppetto.

The next morning, Pinocchio finds the Elixir has transformed his father into a puppet. Madame Flambeau enters their house, and gets angry at Pinocchio for giving the Elixir to his father instead of himself. She reveals she is Lorenzini's widow. Geppetto and Pinocchio are then forced to work at the carnival's show. Geppetto eventually accepts and enjoys being a puppet, much to Pinocchio's dismay. Lampwick had been transformed into a sea donkey because of the Elixir, and Pinocchio finds him in the large fish tank with other children who became fish. Madame Flambeau compromises Pinocchio that if he becomes a puppet, then she will restore Geppetto and Lampwick back to human. Pinocchio co-operates by drinking the Elixir and is restored to a puppet. Pinocchio then finds out Madame Flambeau had deceived him just so he would perform in front of the prince. Seconds before the show, the dwarf takes Pinocchio; Felinet and Volpe take Geppetto and replace the two with inanimate puppets. The prince angrily leaves due to the audience booing. Madame Flambeau and her team consisting of Felinet, Volpe, Mister Laffy, Sizzler and the Strongman go on a search for Geppetto and Pinocchio. The dwarf takes Pinocchio and Lampwick to the forest where Pinocchio came from. The dwarf transforms and reveals himself as Pepe, the talking cricket.

Madame Flambeau finds Geppetto and then finds Pinocchio. Geppetto apologizes to Pinocchio for neglecting his son for fame, and it is implied he wants to be human again. Madame Flambeau then transforms into Lorenzini, a secret he had been hiding the whole time by drinking his own Elixir to restore his humanity. He plans on cooking Lampwick using Pinocchio and Geppetto as the firewood. Pepe gives Pinocchio clues on how to find the Heart of the Mountain. Pinocchio, Geppetto and Lampwick get to the Heart of the Mountain via sliding down a long pathway. Once there, they find a pool called the "magic water", something that turns someone/something into their true nature. Lorenzini and the others also enter the Heart of the Mountain. Lampwick falls into the water and is instantly restored to human. Lorenzini laughs and jumps in the magic water thinking it will make him permanently human, but it instead turns him back into "the sea monster" over a period of time. Geppetto and Pinocchio then jump in and are instantly restored to human. Volpe and Felinet jump in but are still remained as humanoid animals.

The next day, Lorenzini is locked up in a cage, and is laughed at by the carnival's audience for his grotesque sea monster appearance. Pinocchio and Lampwick go to see Geppetto's puppet show, along with a girl called "Isabella" who looks just like Blue but with black hair. Isabella tells Pinocchio that the Elixir can't truly fix anyone's troubles. Geppetto performs in front of the prince, and is applauded by Pinocchio and the rest of the audience. As the second lot of credits roll by, Lorenzini escapes his prison.

Cast
 Martin Landau - Geppetto/Voice of Puppet Geppetto
 Udo Kier - Madame Flambeau & Lorenzini
 Gabriel Thomson - Pinocchio/Voice of Puppet Pinocchio
 Sarah Alexander - Felinet
 Simon Schatzberger - Volpe
 Ben Ridgeway - Lampwick
 Gemma Gregory - Blue Fairy/Isabella
 Warwick Davis - Dwarf/Voice of Pepe the Cricket

Puppeteers
 Richard St. Clair - Pinocchio
 Craig Narramore - Geppetto
 John Wheatly
 Phillip Fason
 Isabel While
 Isabel Blomhoej
 Delphine Maghe
 Francoise Poirson
 Christophe Joncquel

Production
Like The Adventures of Pinocchio, this film used animatronic puppets created by Jim Henson's Creature Shop.

The film's previous actors from the first movie including Jonathan Taylor Thomas, Bebe Neuwirth, Rob Schneider, David Doyle, and Corey Carrier did not reprise their roles in the sequel and were replaced by Gabriel Thomson, Sarah Alexander, Simon Schatzberger, Warwick Davis, and Ben Ridgeway respectively.

Trivia
The fish with human faces are actually the 4 people who bought and drank the elixir right before Pinocchio and Lampwick go into the "Hall of Freaks". The Asian Man is the Asian Fish, the Whining Boy is the blowfish, the Whining Boy's mother is the blue and yellow fish, and the Thin Man is the fish with a top hat. The 4 are restored to human, as they are seen at Geppetto's show at the end of the movie.

Release
It was released in Australia on April 6, 2000.

References

External links
 
 

1999 films
American sequel films
British sequel films
Films set in 1890
English-language German films
Direct-to-video fantasy films
Films directed by Michael Anderson
German sequel films
New Line Cinema films
New Adventures of Pinocchio, The